Jason Maricle is a retired American soccer player who played professionally in the USISL and National Professional Soccer League.

Maricle attended Lees–McRae College where he was a 1990 NJCAA Honorable Mention All American soccer player.  In 1992, he turned professional with the Dayton Dynamo of the National Professional Soccer League.  In 1993, Maricle moved to the Tulsa Roughnecks for the 1993–94 USISL indoor season.  Maricle was the fourth leading scorer in the USISL that season.  Maricle continued to play for Tulsa during the 1995 USISL outdoor season.  In the fall of 1994, he rejoined the Dayton Dynamo.  In 1995, the Dynamo moved to Cincinnati, Ohio and became the Cincinnati Silverbacks.  On November 20, 1995, the Silverbacks sold Maricle’s contract to the Baltimore Spirit.  During the summer of 1996, Maricle left the Spirit to move to Tulsa where he worked for a vinyl sign business.  When he arrived in Tulsa, Maricle signed with the Roughnecks and played for them in his spare time until 1998.

References

Living people
American soccer players
Baltimore Spirit players
Cincinnati Silverbacks players
Dayton Dynamo players
National Professional Soccer League (1984–2001) players
Tulsa Roughnecks (1993–2000) players
USISL players
USL Second Division players
Association football forwards
Association football midfielders
Year of birth missing (living people)
Lees–McRae College alumni